Zuzana Kamasová (born 14 May 1978) is a Slovakian professional golfer. She won the Lalla Meryem Cup in 2011 to become the first Slovakian and Eastern European to win on the Ladies European Tour.

Career
Kamasová won the Slovakian Championship seven times and represented her country at the Espirito Santo Trophy three times, 2000 in Germany, 2002 in Malaysia, 2004 in Puerto Rico.

Kamasová earned limited status on the LET at Q-School in November 2004, and turned professional. Between 2004 and 2007 she only made two cuts, but in 2008 she earned her first top-10 finish at the Suzhou Taihu Ladies Open in China, T9 and 10 strokes behind winner Annika Sörenstam.

With limited LET starts available Kamasová also played on the Swedish Golf Tour, losing a playoff to Florence Lüscher of Switzerland at the 2007 Rejmes Ladies Open, but prevailing in a playoff at the 2007 Telia Ladies Finale for her first professional title. She also finished runner-up at the 2009 VW Söderbergs Ladies Masters, two strokes behind Daniela Holmqvist.

In 2011 Kamasová won the Lalla Meryem Cup in Morocco, two strokes clear of the competition, to become the first Slovakian and Eastern European to secure a victory on the LET. She appeared at the 2011 Women's British Open but did not make the cut.

She retired from tour after the 2013 season.

Professional wins (2)

Ladies European Tour wins (1)

Swedish Golf Tour wins (1)

Team appearances
Amateur
Espirito Santo Trophy (representing Slovakia): 2000, 2002, 2004

References

External links

Slovakian female golfers
Ladies European Tour golfers
Sportspeople from Bratislava
1974 births
Living people